Robinson High School (commonly Robinson or RHS) is a public high school located in Robinson, Texas, United States and is classified as a 4A school by the University Interscholastic League.  It is part of the Robinson Independent School District, which serves students mostly from Robinson; parts of the district extend into Lorena and Waco.  The district also covers several small rural towns including Golinda, Levi, Rosenthal, Asa, Downsville, and Mooreville.  In 2015, the school was rated "Met Standard" by the Texas Education Agency.

Athletics
The Robinson Rockets compete in these sports - 

Cross Country, Volleyball, Football, Basketball, Swimming, Powerlifting, Soccer, Tennis, Golf, Track, Baseball and Softball.

Until the mid-2000s, the girls' athletic teams were referred to as the Rockettes; however, this nickname has largely fallen out of use and now refers chiefly to the school's drill team.  Students also have won individual UIL 3A state titles in track, cross country, and powerlifting.

State titles
Girls' Basketball - 
1970(2A), 2009(3A)
Softball - 
1999(3A)
Girls' Track - 
1974(1A)

Band
The Robinson High School Marching Band, "The Pride of the Blue" has made 20 appearances at the state marching contest, winning three marching championships.

Marching Band State Champions 
1984(3A), 1994(3A), 1996(3A)

Notable alumni 
 Jason Tucker - NFL & CFL Football - Dallas Cowboys, Edmonton Eskimos.
 Clint Dolezel - American football coach and former professional arena football player in the Arena Football League (AFL).

References

External links
 Robinson Independent School District official website

High schools in Central Texas
Schools in McLennan County, Texas
Public high schools in Texas